D312 is a state road in the western Slavonia region of Croatia connecting the D47 road in Brestača to the centre of Novska.

The road, as well as all other state roads in Croatia, is managed and maintained by Hrvatske ceste, state owned company.

Road junctions and populated areas

Sources

See also
 A3 motorway

State roads in Croatia
Sisak-Moslavina County